Lepanthes (from Greek "scaled-flower") is a large genus of orchids with about 800–1000 species, distributed in the Antilles and from Mexico through Bolivia (with very few species in Brazil). The genus is abbreviated in horticultural trade as Lths. Almost all the species in the genus are small and live in cloud forests. Babyboot orchid is a common name.

See also
Draconanthes
List of Lepanthes species
List of the largest genera of flowering plants

References

  (1799) Nova Acta Regiae Societatis Scientiarum Upsaliensis 6: 85, f. 6.
  (2006) Epidendroideae (Part One). Genera Orchidacearum 4: 362 ff. Oxford University Press.
  (2009) Icones Pleurothallidinarum XXX. Monographs in Systematic Botany from the Missouri Botanical Garden 115: 1-265.

External links

 
Pleurothallidinae genera
Taxa named by Olof Swartz